Monax may refer to 
 Marmota monax or groundhog
 Monax, a colour used in depression glass